The former Lake Ontario Ordnance Works (LOOW) was a  military installation located in Niagara County, New York, United States, approximately  north of Niagara Falls.

The property was purchased by the War Department during World War II as a location for the production of TNT.  Most of the LOOW property was sold after the war.

The United States Department of Energy currently owns  of the original LOOW property, on which the Niagara Falls Storage Site (NFSS) is located.  The NFSS is used for the storage of radioactive materials produced during the development of America's first atom bombs.

Approximately 93 percent of the original LOOW site—currently occupied by homes, a school, a campground, the Basilica of the National Shrine of Our Lady of Fatima, farms, local and federal government operations, and a toxic waste facility—meets the criteria of a Formerly Used Defense Site, and one portion of the property is listed as a Superfund cleanup site.

History

The War Department purchased  of farmland east of Youngstown, New York, in 1941 as a location to manufacture TNT.  The location was selected because of its proximity to chemical manufacturing plants, to Fort Niagara, to the New York Central Railroad, and to water and electrical power.

The LOOW headquarters were at first located in a vegetable canning factory at the site.

The 149 private landowners living there—mostly farmers and orchard growers—were given 30 days to move out, and most of their 125 farmhouses and 538 barns were torn down or burned.  Some homes located on the periphery of the LOOW boundary were kept.

Construction of the TNT plant began in January 1941, and employed over 7,500 workers.  The production and storage areas occupied approximately  near the center of property, and the remaining  was undeveloped and used as a "buffer zone".  A hospital, dormitories, fire department, power plant, USO hall, water supply system, and waste treatment facility were located at the LOOW, and TNT was manufactured for about 9 months, until the plant was decommissioned in 1943.

Uranium used to produce the first atom bombs from 1942 to 1948 was processed by Linde Air Products in nearby Tonawanda, and in 1944, the Manhattan Engineer District began using the LOOW site for the storage and transshipment of radioactive residues and wastes created through the processing of uranium ore at Linde.

The War Assets Administration had by 1948 sold or transferred  of the original property, and the remaining  were given to the newly formed Atomic Energy Commission.

Buildings and operations

Building 401

Beginning in 1943, Building 401 was used as the powerhouse for the production of TNT, though operations lasted less than a year.  Building 401 was renovated, and from 1953–59 and 1965–71, it was used as a Boron-10 isotope separation plant.  The interior of Building 401 was gutted in 1971, and its hardware and instrumentation were disposed of.  Building 401 was demolished in 2010.

Concrete silo

A  concrete silo was erected within the east boundary of the LOOW, immediately next to Porter Center Road, which was publicly accessible.  A fence with signs warning of "radioactive material" ran next to the road.  In 1952, drums containing  of highly-radioactive K-65 residues were loaded into the silo.  The concrete silo was dismantled sometime after 1979.

Interim waste containment structure

Construction of the interim waste containment structure was completed in 1991, and is located entirely within the Niagara Falls Storage Site.  The  mound is used for the storage of radioactive waste and residues, and the grass-covered "interim cap" is designed to retard both rainwater infiltration and radon emission.

All of the contaminated and radioactive materials stored at the former LOOW site—including thorium, uranium, and the world's largest concentration of radium-226—were placed into the structure.

Rochester Burial Site
In 1951, laboratory waste and animals that had been injected with plutonium during experiments at the University of Rochester were shipped to the LOOW site for burial.

US Army operations
The United States Army was given an  parcel of land from the original LOOW property, located on the northeast boundary.  Beginning in 1957 it housed 36 Nike surface-to-air missiles intended to protect the nearby Niagara Hydroelectric Power Project.  The property is currently licensed to the New York Army National Guard, and is used as a weekend training site.

US Air Force operations
A  parcel of land from the original LOOW property was given to the United States Air Force, on which they located an experimental rocket fuel plant called the Youngstown Test Annex Site.

Private waste treatment facilities
 Hooker Chemical Company purchased a large portion of the original LOOW property from a private landowner in 1975 to use as a dump site.
 Waste Management, Inc currently owns and operates a  treatment, storage, disposal, and recovery facility near the center of the former LOOW property.  It is the only hazardous waste landfill remaining in the Northeastern United States, and was the location where the anthrax-contaminated desk of news-anchor Tom Brokaw was disposed of in 2001.
 Modern Disposal Services operates a landfill on the former LOOW property.

Other uses
Approximately 380 private residences and a mobile home park are located within the footprint of the former LOOW site. A school, several small farms, a  campground, and the Basilica of the National Shrine of Our Lady of Fatima, which attracts thousands of visitors annually, are also located in the former LOOW site.

Safety concerns
In 1981, the New York State Assembly Task Force on Toxic Substances wrote that the LOOW was "born in the crisis of war", and that:

The report added that radioactive waste had been stored "in rusting barrels stacked along the roadside".

Author Ginger Strand wrote about the LOOW in her 2008 book Inventing Niagara: "the Army Corps engineers, currently charged with the cleanup, readily admit they don't know everything that went on there".

An extensive study conducted by the United States Army Corps of Engineers concluded in 2014 that there was "no evidence of potential source areas or releases of contamination to groundwater, surface water, or soil associated with any of the ground disturbances evaluated" at the former LOOW site.

One portion of the property containing contaminated groundwater is listed as a Superfund cleanup site.

A 2005 article in the Niagara Gazette alleged that radiation at the site was causing an ongoing hazard for the nearby Lewiston-Porter Central School District.

References

Geography of Niagara County, New York
Manhattan Project sites
Project Nike
Radioactive waste repositories in the United States
United States Army arsenals
United States Army arsenals during World War II
Installations of the U.S. Department of Defense
Superfund sites in New York (state)
Landfills in the United States
Environmental issues in New York (state)
United States Department of Energy facilities
1941 establishments in New York (state)